Valencia's Aquarium (officially Acuario de Valencia, Fundación Seijas) is a recreational park located in Valencia, Venezuela. It is the largest aquarium in Venezuela, and it also has a small zoo with species from Venezuela. It is operated by the J.V. Seijas Foundation.

This aquarium has the only trained captive Amazon river dolphins in the world. It also has many species of fish, snakes and other animals as well as plants endemic to Venezuela.

There is also a small park for children, with bumper cars, a carousel and other games.

Notes

External links
 (Spanish)

Aquaria in Venezuela
Buildings and structures in Valencia, Venezuela
Tourist attractions in Carabobo